Clayfield College is an independent, Uniting Church and Presbyterian, day and boarding school, located in Clayfield, an inner-northern suburb of Brisbane, Queensland, Australia. The College is owned and governed by the Presbyterian and Methodist Schools Association.
 
Founded in 1931, the College has a non-selective enrolment policy and caters for approximately 1,000 students from Pre-Prep to Year 12, including boarders from Years 5 to 12. 

Clayfield College is affiliated with the Association of Heads of Independent Schools of Australia (AHISA), the Junior School Heads Association of Australia (JSHAA), the Australian Boarding Schools' Association (ABSA), the Alliance of Girls' Schools Australasia (AGSA), and has been a member of the Queensland Girls' Secondary Schools Sports Association (QGSSSA) since 1941.

History
Clayfield College grew out of the Brisbane Boys' College (BBC), which was founded in 1902. In 1906, BBC moved to Bayview Terrace, Clayfield, moving again in 1930 to its present location at Toowong, as the school had outgrown the Clayfield campus. Subsequently, in 1931, Clayfield College was founded on BBC's former site, as the primary school department of Somerville House (a girls' school). The secondary school at Clayfield was established in 1935 and Clayfield College was separated from Somerville House.

In 1939, Clayfield College opened its boarding school and chose as its motto the Latin Luceat Lux Vestra ("Let Your Light Shine"). The college began its house system in 1946, with four houses – Campbell, Gibson, Radcliffe and Youngman, with Henderson incorporated soon after. Ashburn house came later in honour of Clayfield's first principal, Ida Nancy Ashburn who retired in 1964. Opened the same year, the college library was named after her.

The school's second principal, Ida Kennedy, who retired in 1990, saw the establishment of a science building, a new boarding house, an assembly hall, separate primary department, a second boarding house, the music centre and new classrooms during the 1970s and 1980s. The college chapel was built in 1985.

Mrs Carolyn Hauff AM became the third principal in 1991, retiring in 2006. Mrs Hauff saw the refurbishment and expansion of classrooms and boarding house during the 1990s. In 1997, Clayfield's Physical Education Centre was built on the former site of the Savoy Theatre, and named after Ida Kennedy, the schools second principal. The development included a tunnel under Sandgate Road providing safe access to the east. Clayfield College continued expansion to the east of Sandgate Road by buying the Turrawan Private Hospital and converting it into a new boarding facility.

From 2007 to 2014, Brian Savins served as the fourth principal of the college. In 2009, Clayfield introduced middle schooling to link junior and senior schooling in a continuous P-12 learning environment. At the same time, the opportunity was taken to adopt the six pastoral houses across the whole college. In October 2010, Clayfield built a new junior schooling building incorporating ten classrooms and administration centre. 

In September of 2021, it was announced by the College, that Clayfield College would be transitioning into co-education for both the primary and secondary schools. Parallel learning will take place in the Middle School and then fully co-educational classes in the Senior School. As well as this, major renovations are to be conducted to accommodate this change. These will take place in the PE Centre, Science Labs and other areas as well.

In September 2021, the College announced that Queensland parents will have a new education option from 2023. Clayfield College will transition to be fully coeducational (Pre-Prep to Year 12) using the Parallel Learning model that sees girls and boys learning together from Pre-Prep to Year 6, then learning in single-sex classrooms for Year 7 through to Year 9. In Year 10 students come together for selected classes, and then benefit from fully coeducational classes in Years 11 and 12. 

The current principal is Dr. Andrew Cousins.

Parallel Learning
A new education option for Queensland families. Clayfield College will begin the transition to a coeducational day and boarding school in 2023 and offer families the best of co-education and single-sex education using the distinctive Parallel Learning model.

Unique to Clayfield College, the Parallel Learning model will see students experience all the advantages of a coeducational environment as they grow and develop through their early years and primary school. Then, starting in 2023, Year 7 students will begin single-sex learning streams, continuing through Years 8 and 9. In Year 10 students come together for selected classes, and then benefit from fully coeducational classes in Years 11 and 12. Parents no longer have to decide between single-sex and coeducation in advance. Clayfield College offers the best of both worlds – gender-specific teaching when it matters most, with all the social benefits of a co-educational campus.

Curriculum
Students in Years P-10 study a core curriculum based on the Australian curriculum key learning areas. In Year 9, and again in 10, students may choose electives from within languages, the arts and technology as well as continuing to study in the other core learning areas.

English and Mathematics are compulsory for all students in Years 11 and 12. In addition, students elect to study four other subjects ranging from Arts, Business, Languages, Sciences, Social Sciences, Health & Physical Education and Technology. English as a Second Language (ESL) is offered throughout the Senior School to students from non-English speaking backgrounds.

Co-curriculum

Sport
Sports offered by Clayfield College include artistic gymnastics, athletics, badminton, cricket, cross country, hockey, netball, soccer, softball, swimming, tennis, touch football, and volleyball.

Notable alumnae

Tania Major – youngest person elected to the Aboriginal and Torres Strait Islander Commission; 2007 Young Australian of the Year
Grace Shaw (Mallrat); Artist who has appeared within the top 3 of the Triple J Hottest 100, 2020, with her song Charlie. 
Jan McLucas – from 23 March 2013, federal Minister for Human Services; Senator (ALP) for Queensland
Elizabeth Perkins OAM – one of the first women to reach the rank of Associate Professor at James Cook University; member of the Literature Board of the Australia Council; founding editor of Literature in North Queensland 
Stephanie Rice – swimmer; Commonwealth Games gold medallist and Olympic gold medallist
Karin Schaupp – classical guitarist

References

External links

Educational institutions established in 1931
Private schools in Brisbane
Presbyterian schools in Australia
Former Methodist schools in Australia
Uniting Church schools in Australia
Boarding schools in Queensland
Girls' schools in Queensland
Junior School Heads Association of Australia Member Schools
 
Clayfield, Queensland
Alliance of Girls' Schools Australasia
1931 establishments in Australia